The Decatur Cemetery is a historic graveyard within the City of Decatur, Georgia.

History 
The Decatur Cemetery is the oldest burial ground in the Atlanta metropolitan area, and it is believed to have been used even before Decatur's 1823 incorporation.

In 1832, an act by the local legislature created “Commissioners for the Decatur Burial Ground.” Numerous Civil War veterans were buried in the Decatur Cemetery, mostly in the  region now referred to as, "The Old Cemetery". Built in 1881, a wooden well house, with lattice and shingle details, has been restored by the Friends of Decatur Cemetery (FODC). The well hole has been sealed over with concrete for safety reasons and it's today used as a gazebo.

Today 
A special section exists for cremated burials; the cemetery also contains a pond stocked with fish. This pond is also home to swans, ducks and turtles, and is a stopping place for Canada geese on migration. The cemetery is bordered by a several acre forest, which borders the Glennwood Estates neighborhood.

Features 
The forested ravine east of the cemetery includes a newly completed pedestrian path that winds over a branch of Peachtree Creek.  A small waterfall is just south of the southern bridge.

At the southeast corner of the cemetery is found a grove of giant bamboo, some with trunks over 20 cm in diameter. A short path leads through this grove to the end of the Ponce de Leon Court Historic District.

Notable graves
 Lt. Col. Robert Augustus Alston (1832-1879); state legislator and journalist, owner of Meadow Nook
 Emily Verdery Battey (1826—1912); journalist
 Col. Milton A. Candler (1837–1909); state senator and U.S. Congressman
 Dr Thomas Holley Chivers (1806–1858); physician and poet
 Mary Ann Harris Gay (1829–1918); author of Life in Dixie During the War
 William S. Howard (1875 – August 1, 1953) U.S. Congressman
 Mary Gregory Jewett (1908 – January 16, 1976), historian and journalist
 Rev. Hovie Lister (1926-2001) Gospel musician (The Statesmen Quartet)
 Charles Murphey (1799–1861); U.S. Congressman and a delegate to the Georgia Secession Convention
 Robert Ramspeck (1890-1972) U.S. Congressman
 Col. George Washington Scott (1829–1903); founder of Agnes Scott College
 Andrew Sledd (1870–1939); founding president of the modern University of Florida, and Emory University professor
 Leslie Jasper Steele (1868–1929) Mayor of Decatur, U.S. Congressman
 Benjamin F. Swanton (1807–1890) owner of the historic Swanton House
 Leila Ross Wilburn (1885–1967) pioneering woman architect

Gallery

References

External links

 Decatur Cemetery on Find a Grave
 Decatur Cemetery on Waymarking
 Historic Decatur Cemetery on HMdb

Cemeteries in Atlanta
Atlanta metropolitan area
Cemeteries on the National Register of Historic Places in Georgia (U.S. state)
Protected areas of DeKalb County, Georgia
Historic districts on the National Register of Historic Places in Georgia (U.S. state)
National Register of Historic Places in Atlanta